This article is a list of episodes from the television show Science Ninja Team Gatchaman in order by air date.

Episode list

References

Further reading
 G-Force: Animated

External links

Lists of science fiction television series episodes
Gatchaman episodes